The Catholic Church in Madagascar is part of the worldwide Catholic Church, under the spiritual leadership of the Pope in Rome.

About one quarter of the population of Madagascar is Catholic – about four million adherents in total.  There are 21 dioceses including five archdioceses. Below is a list of the archdioceses dioceses, and the archbishops and bishops of each.

Antananarivo – Odon Marie Arsène Razanakolona
Antsirabe – Philippe Ranaivomanana
Miarinarivo – Jean Claude Randrianarisoa
Tsiroanomandidy – Gustavo Bombin Espino
Antsiranana – Michel Malo
Ambanja – Rosario Saro Vella, S.D.B.
Mahajanga – Joseph Ignace Randrianasolo
Port-Bergé – Georges Varkey Puthiyakulangara

Fianarantsoa – Fulgence Rabemahafaly
Ambositra – Fidelis Rakotonarivo
Farafangana – Benjamin Marc Ramaroson
Ihosy – Philippe Ranaivomanana
Mananjary – - José Alfredo Caires de Nobrega
Toamasina – Desire Tsarahazana
Ambatondrazaka – Antoine Scopelliti
Fenoarivo Atsinanana – Marcellin Randriamamonjy
Moramanga – Gaetano Di Pierro
Toliara – Fulgence Rabeony
Morombe – Zygmunt Robaszkiewicz
Morondava – Marie Fabien Raharilamboniaina
Tôlagnaro – Vincent Rakotozafy

See also
Pedro Opeka
Catholic Church by country
List of saints from Africa

References

External links

 http://www.gcatholic.org/dioceses/country/MG.htm